The Fire Within (meaning "The Manic Fire" or "Will-o'-the-Wisp") is a 1963 drama film written and directed by Louis Malle, based on the 1931 novel Will O' the Wisp by Pierre Drieu La Rochelle, which itself was inspired by the life of Jacques Rigaut. The film stars Maurice Ronet, Jeanne Moreau—who had previously worked with Ronet and Malle in Elevator to the Gallows—as well as Alexandra Stewart, Bernard Noel, Lena Skerla, Hubert Deschamps and Yvonne Clech. The score features the music of Erik Satie.

Plot
Alain Leroy is a recovering alcoholic at a rehabilitation clinic in Versailles, and he remains at the clinic, not working, even though his doctors believe he is ready to return to ordinary life. He is pensive and despondent, and is separated from his wife, who lives in New York. He intends to commit suicide but first decides to visit his friends in Paris one final time, trying to find a reason to live.

After his arrival in Paris, he sees one friend after another and has a series of conversations, some surface-level, some introspective. After one chat at a café, he relapses and becomes physically ill, and is taken in by old acquaintances who then hold a dinner party which Leroy attends. He is given more to drink at the party, and becomes sarcastic and belligerent. The stark contrast and seemingly pointless nature of his friends' bourgeois existence only brings Leroy into a state of even further frustration with his perceived absence of meaning in life.

The following morning, he receives a call from Solange, who was at the party the previous evening. She expresses interest in him, but he rebuffs her, and hangs up on her. He then shoots himself in the heart.

Cast

Reception
The film was selected as the French entry for the Best Foreign Language Film at the 36th Academy Awards, but was not accepted as a nominee. In his 2006 Movie Guide, Leonard Maltin gives the film 3.5 stars (out of four) and calls it "probably Malle's best early film." Roger Ebert gave the film the same rating, describing it as a "triumph of style."

American director Wes Anderson's works were generally influenced by Malle, with The Royal Tenenbaums (2001) particularly drawing from The Fire Within. A line from The Fire Within is also translated into English and appears as "I'm going to kill myself tomorrow" in The Royal Tenenbaums.

See also
 List of submissions to the 36th Academy Awards for Best Foreign Language Film
 List of French submissions for the Academy Award for Best Foreign Language Film

References

External links
 
 
 
 The Fire Within review at filmsdefrance.com
The Fire Within: Day of the Dead – an essay by Michel Ciment at The Criterion Collection

1963 films
1963 drama films
1960s French-language films
Films about alcoholism
Films about depression
Films about suicide
Films based on French novels
Films based on works by Pierre Drieu La Rochelle
Films directed by Louis Malle
Films set in Paris
Films shot in Paris
French black-and-white films
French drama films
Italian black-and-white films
Italian drama films
Media containing Gymnopedies
Venice Grand Jury Prize winners
1960s Italian films
1960s French films